Michael A. Saporito (born May 3, 1962) is an American prelate of the Roman Catholic Church who has been serving as an auxiliary bishop for the Archdiocese of Newark in New Jersey since 2020.

Biography
Michael Saporito was born on May 3, 1962 in Newark, New Jersey. On May 30, 1992, Saporito was ordained to the priesthood for the Archdiocese of Newark by then Archbishop Theodore McCarrick.

Pope Francis appointed Saporito as an auxiliary bishop for the Diocese of Newark on February 27, 2020.  Saporito's consecration as a bishop, originally scheduled for May 5, 2020 but postponed due to the COVID-19 pandemic, occurred on June 30, 2020.  He was consecrated by Cardinal Joseph W. Tobin.

See also

 Catholic Church hierarchy
 Catholic Church in the United States
 Historical list of the Catholic bishops of the United States
 List of Catholic bishops of the United States
 Lists of patriarchs, archbishops, and bishops

References

External links
 Roman Catholic Diocese of Newark Official Site

Episcopal succession

1962 births
Living people
21st-century Roman Catholic bishops in the United States
Clergy from Newark, New Jersey
Bishops appointed by Pope Francis